Poecilandra is a genus of flowering plants belonging to the family Ochnaceae.

Its native range is Southern Tropical America.

Species:

Poecilandra pumila 
Poecilandra retusa

References

Ochnaceae
Malpighiales genera